The 1994–95 United Counties League season was the 88th in the history of the United Counties League, a football competition in England.

Premier Division

The Premier Division featured 19 clubs which competed in the division last season. No new clubs joined the division this season.  But Boston changed name to Boston Town.

League table

Division One

Division One featured 17 clubs which competed in the division last season, along with two new clubs:
Daventry Town, demoted from the Premier Division
St Neots Town, joined from the Huntingdonshire League

League table

References

External links
 United Counties League

1994–95 in English football leagues
United Counties League seasons